This article includes the 2014 ITF Men's Circuit tournaments which occurred between April and June 2014.

Point distribution

Key

Month

April

May

June

References

External links
International Tennis Federation official website

 04-06